The Earth Is ... is the eleventh studio album by British-Australian soft rock duo Air Supply, released in 1991 and their first for Giant Records. It was their comeback album after taking a break in 1987, with Russell Hitchcock releasing his eponymous debut solo album in 1988.

The Earth Is ... did not peak on the American charts, but it produced a worldwide tour in which the band focused on Asian countries and Latin America. The interpretation of "Without You" reached No. 48 on the US Adult Contemporary chart. "Dame Amor" is the first song by the band recorded in Spanish.

Track listing
"Stronger Than the Night" (Graham Russell, Michael Sherwood, David Young) – 4:15
"Without You" (Tom Evans, Pete Ham) – 4:57
"The Earth Is" (Graham Russell, Michael Sherwood) – 5:37
"Speaking of Love" (Jimmy Haun, Graham Russell, Michael Sherwood, David Young) – 4:30
"She's Got the Answer" (Larry Antonino, Jimmy Haun, Graham Russell, Michael Sherwood) – 5:45
"Stop the Tears" (Jan Buckingham, Jaime Kyle) – 4:14
"Dame Amor" (Jimmy Haun, Graham Russell, Michael Sherwood) – 6:15
"Dancing with the Mountain" (Graham Russell, Michael Sherwood, David Young) – 5:28
"Love Conquers Time" (Graham Russell) – 5:01
"Bread and Blood" (Graham Russell) – 4:38

Personnel 

 Russell Hitchcock – lead vocals (1–4, 6–10), backing vocals (1, 3–6, 8–10)
 Graham Russell – acoustic guitar (1–3, 6, 9), backing vocals (1, 3, 4, 8–10), harmony vocals (2), lead vocals (3, 5, 7–10), drums (3), percussion (3), drum programming (3, 7), 12-string guitar (7), acoustic piano (10) 
 Guy Allison – keyboards (1, 3–6, 8, 9), programming (3, 6, 8)
 David Young – keyboards (1, 4, 9), drum programming (8)
 Randy Kerber – acoustic piano (2)
 Brad Buxer – strings (2, 4), keyboards (3–6, 8), programming (3, 6, 8)
 Michael Sherwood – keyboards (5)
 Jimmy Haun – guitar (1, 3–6, 8, 9), acoustic guitar (2), electric guitar (2)
 Larry Antonino – bass (1–7, 9), backing vocals (1, 4, 5), fretless bass (8)
 Ralph Cooper – drums (1, 3, 4, 9), percussion (3), drum programming (3, 5–8)
 Michito Sánchez – percussion (7)
 Novi Novog – viola (10)
 Karen Tobin – additional backing vocals (6)

Production
 Producer and engineer – Harry Maslin
 Assistant engineers – James Jason, Jason Roberts and Talley Sherwood.
 Tracks 1, 2 & 6 remixed by Humberto Gatica at Ground Control Studios (Los Angeles, CA), assisted by Alex Rodriguez.
 Mastered by Humberto Gatica at Precision Sound (Los Angeles, CA).
 Package design – Christine Cano
 Artwork – Valerie Lettera
 Photography – Dean Armstrong

References

1991 albums
Air Supply albums
Giant Records (Warner) albums